William McGregor (born 3 December 1949) is a Canadian judoka. He competed in the men's half-middleweight event at the 1972 Summer Olympics.

References

1949 births
Living people
Canadian male judoka
Olympic judoka of Canada
Judoka at the 1972 Summer Olympics
Sportspeople from Toronto